Papalia is an Italian surname, and may refer to:

 Adam Papalia, Australian sportscaster
 Carmen Papalia, Canadian artist
 Melanie Papalia, Canadian actress
 Paul Papalia, Australian politician
 The Papalia crime family, an Italian-Canadian crime family
 Johnny Papalia, Canadian mobster

Italian-language surnames